
Lai Sin's is a defunct restaurant in Driebergen-Rijsenburg, in the Netherlands. It was a fine dining restaurant that was awarded one Michelin star in 1996 and retained that rating until 2008. Lai Sin's chef de cuisine was Kwong On Wong.

The restaurant closed 1 November 2011, when owner Lai Sin Zei sold the restaurant. After a renovation, restaurant Villa Zuidoost opened up in 2012.

Lai Sin's was a member of the Alliance Gastronomique Néerlandaise in the period 1994–2011.

See also
List of Michelin starred restaurants in the Netherlands

References

External links
 Heuvelrugnieuws.nl - Photo of Lai Sin's

Defunct restaurants in the Netherlands
Restaurants in the Netherlands
Michelin Guide starred restaurants in the Netherlands
Restaurants in Utrecht (province)
Utrechtse Heuvelrug